Dylan Thompson is an American football quarterback.

Dylan Thompson may also refer to:

Dylan Thompson, an American snowboarder who competed in Winter X Games XVII
Dylan Thompson, fictional character in the TV series Cuckoo